Carmine Giorgione (born 17 June 1991) is an Italian professional footballer who plays for Serie C club AlbinoLeffe, which he captains. He spent over 7 seasons in Serie C.

Club career

Early career
Born in Benevento, Campania, Giorgione played for the Berretti and Primavera youth teams of Veneto side Padova until January 2010. Before joining Padova, he also played for the "Giovanissimi" youth team of Campania side Avellino as a striker.

In January 2010 he was sold to Lega Pro Prima Divisione side Varese on a co-ownership deal. In June 2010, Padova gave up the remaining 50% registration rights of Giorgione to Varese.

At the start of 2010–11 season, Giorgione was signed by Lega Pro Seconda Divisione side Valenzana on a temporary deal. In the next season he left for Savona on another loan.

In October 2012, Giorgione left for Serie D side Asti.

In 2013, Giorgione left for Greek fourth division side Kissamikos.

In 2014, Giorgione was re-signed by Savona for the first ever Serie C league since 1978.

In 2015, he left for fellow Serie C side Messina.

AlbinoLeffe
On 23 August 2016, Giorgione was signed by AlbinoLeffe.

References

External links
 
 
 AIC profile, data by football.it 

Italian footballers
U.S. Avellino 1912 players
Calcio Padova players
Savona F.B.C. players
A.C.R. Messina players
U.C. AlbinoLeffe players
Serie C players
Association football midfielders
Sportspeople from Benevento
Italian expatriate footballers
Italian expatriate sportspeople in Greece
Expatriate footballers in Greece
1991 births
Living people
Footballers from Campania